Sergey Ryzhikov may refer to:

 Sergey Ryzhikov (cosmonaut) (born 1974), Russian cosmonaut
 Sergey Ryzhikov (footballer) (born 1980), Russian football player